Goizueta is a town and municipality located in the province and autonomous community of Navarre, northern Spain.

History
The Spanish conquest of Iberian Navarre started in 1512 with a Guipuzkoan militia capturing it on 10 July 1512.

References
Bustillo Kastrexana, Joxerra (2012). Guía de la conquista de Navarra en 12 escenarios. Donostia: Txertoa Argitaletxea.

External links
 GOIZUETA in the Bernardo Estornés Lasa - Auñamendi Encyclopedia (Euskomedia Fundazioa) 

Municipalities in Navarre